María Teresa Rivas (born María Teresa Orozco Moreno; May 6, 1918 – July 23, 2010) was a Mexican actress. Along with Silvia Derbez, she is considered one of the pioneers of telenovelas in Mexico, appearing in more than 50 in her career, beginning with an iconic villain role in Gutierritos (1958).

Biography
María Teresa Rivas was born in Unión de San Antonio, Jalisco, on May 6, 1918. She was baptized with the name María Teresa Orozco Moreno. She began her career as an actress in the 1950s, debuting in the film Tierra de hombres. She gained widespread notice in the 1958 telenovela Gutierritos, playing Rosa Hernández, the villainous wife of the protagonist.

She went on to have a prolific career that included film, theater, and television. She appeared in films such as Las señoritas Vivanco, Qué noche aquella, Simitrio, and 'Cuando los hijos se pierden. Her television roles included a variety of telenovelas, such as Una noche sin mañana, Las abuelas, 'Cruz de amor, Los ricos también lloran, Colorina, Bianca Vidal, Agujetas de color de rosa, and Amor gitano. She also excelled as a poet and composer, recording albums, and some of her songs were performed by singers such as Amparo Montes and Daniela Romo.

She married Federico López Rivas, and they remained together until his death in 1989. They had three children, and she eventually became a grandmother of nine and a great-grandmother of fifteen.

Her last major role was on the telenovela Carita de ángel, after which she retired from acting. She only made one further appearance, in a 2001 chapter of Mujer, Casos de la Vida Real.

María Teresa Rivas died at Santa Elena Hospital in Mexico City on July 23, 2010. The next day, she was cremated and her ashes were deposited at the Rancho "La Pitaya" in her hometown of Unión de San Antonio. Actors and friends such as Héctor Bonilla, Julieta Egurrola, and Leticia Perdigón came to express their condolences.

Filmography

Telenovelas

Awards and nominations
 Nominated for Best Leading Actress for Capricho at the 12th TVyNovelas Awards (1994)
 Nominated for Best Leading Actress for Agujetas de color de rosa at the 13th TVyNovelas Awards (1995)

Notes

References

External links
 
 

1918 births
2010 deaths
Actresses from Jalisco
Mexican film actresses
Mexican stage actresses
Mexican telenovela actresses